Sabet is a surname. Notable people with the surname include:

Abdul Jabar Sabet ((1945–2023), Afghan politician
Bijan Sabet, American venture capitalist and diplomat
Firoozeh Kashani-Sabet (born 1967), American-Iranian historian
Habib Sabet (1903–1993), Iranian businessman 
Hossein Sabet (born 1934), Iranian businessman
Kevin Sabet (born 1979), American governmental official
Khaled Sabet (born 1961), Egyptian sports shooter
Mounir Sabet (born 1936), Egyptian general
Scarlett Sabet (born 1989), English poet 
Tarek Sabet (born 1963), Egyptian sports shooter